39S ribosomal protein L12, mitochondrial is a protein that in humans is encoded by the MRPL12 gene.

Mammalian mitochondrial ribosomal proteins are encoded by nuclear genes and help in protein synthesis within the mitochondrion. Mitochondrial ribosomes (mitoribosomes) consist of a small 28S subunit and a large 39S subunit. They have an estimated 75% protein to rRNA composition compared to prokaryotic ribosomes, where this ratio is reversed. Another difference between mammalian mitoribosomes and prokaryotic ribosomes is that the latter contain a 5S rRNA. Among different species, the proteins comprising the mitoribosome differ greatly in sequence, and sometimes in biochemical properties, which prevents easy recognition by sequence homology. This gene encodes a 39S subunit protein which forms homodimers. In prokaryotic ribosomes, two L7/L12 dimers and one L10 protein form the L8 protein complex.

References

Further reading

Ribosomal proteins